Ficimia streckeri, also commonly known as the Mexican hooknose snake, the Tamaulipan hooknose snake, and the Texas hook-nosed snake, is a small species of snake in the family Colubridae. The species is native to northeastern Mexico and adjacent southern Texas.

Etymology
The specific name or epithet, streckeri, is in honor of the American naturalist John Kern Strecker Jr.

Geographic range
F. streckeri is found primarily in the Mexican states of Hidalgo, Nuevo León, Puebla, eastern San Luis Potosí, and Tamaulipas, but its geographic range extends as far north as southern Texas in the United States.

Description
The Mexican hooknose snake is usually  in total length (including tail). H.M. Smith and Brodie (1982) report a maximum total length of 47.9 cm (almost 19 inches).

It is typically brown or gray in color, with as many as 60 brown or brown-green blotches down the back, which are elongated to almost appear as stripes. Its underside is white or cream-colored.

Its most distinctive feature is an upturned snout, much like hognose snakes, which gives it its common name. However, unlike hognose snakes, Mexican hooknose snakes have smooth dorsal scales. Also distinctive is the arrangement of the head shields.  There are no internasals, and the rostral separates the prefrontals and contacts the frontal.

The smooth dorsal scales are arranged in 17 rows at midbody. Ventrals 126–155, subcaudals 28–41.

Behavior
The Mexican hooknose snake is mostly nocturnal, and is a burrower. It is fairly slow-moving and harmless to humans.

Diet
The diet of F. streckeri consists primarily of spiders and centipedes.

Habitat
The Mexican hooknose snake inhabits woodlands along the Rio Grande river plain, near natural and man-made sources of water.

Defense
The primary form of defense of F. streckeri is making a popping sound by expanding its cloaca when harassed or handled.

Reproduction
The Mexican hooknose snake is oviparous.

References

External links
Herps of Texas: Ficimia streckeri

Further reading
Axtell RW (1950). "Two Specimens of the Snake Ficimia streckeri from Texas". Copeia 1950 (2): 157.
Goldberg SR (2016). "Notes on the Testicular Cycle of the Mexican Hooknose Snake, Ficimia streckeri (Serpentes, Colubridae)". Sonoran Herpetologist 29 (4): 48.
Heimes P (2016). Snakes of Mexico: Herpetofauna Mexicana Vol. I. Frankfurt am Main, Germany: Chimaira. 572 pp. .
Taylor EH (1931). "Notes on Two Specimens of the Rare Snake Ficimia cana and the Description of a New Species of Ficimia from Texas". Copeia 1931 (1): 4–7. (Ficimia streckeri, new species).
Zim HS, Smith HM (1956). Reptiles and Amphibians: A Guide to Familiar American Species. Revised Edition. Golden Nature Guides Series. New York: Simon and Schuster. 160 pp. (Ficimia streckeri, pp. 83–84, 156).

Colubrids
Reptiles described in 1931
Reptiles of Mexico
Reptiles of the United States
Fauna of the Rio Grande valleys